Willem Janssen (born 4 July 1986) is a Dutch professional football official and a former player who played as a central defender. He is the technical director of VVV-Venlo.

Club career
Born in Nijmegen, Janssen made his professional debut for VVV-Venlo in the 2004–05 season, before signing for Roda JC in 2007.

In November 2010, it was announced that Janssen would move to FC Twente at the end of the 2010–11 season, on a free transfer.

In August 2013, Janssen was sent on loan at FC Utrecht for the remainder of the season.

Post-playing career
In July 2022, Janssen joined VVV-Venlo as a technical director.

Honours
Twente
Johan Cruijff Schaal: 2011

References

External links
 
 
 Voetbal International profile 

1986 births
Living people
Footballers from Nijmegen
Association football midfielders
Dutch footballers
Eredivisie players
Eerste Divisie players
VVV-Venlo players
Roda JC Kerkrade players
FC Twente players
FC Utrecht players
Netherlands under-21 international footballers